Paratornoceratinae is a subfamily of oxyconic dimeroceratids included in the order Goniatitida, a group of Paleozoic ammonoids, which have closer affinity to living coleoids than to Nautilus.

Paratornoceratinae as defined by Ebbighausen,  Becker, & Bockwinkel in 2002 comprises three recognised genera with sharp, oxyconic, venters; Acrimeroceras, Paratornoceras, and Polonites.  The shell, as described for the type, Paratornoceras, is subglobular and evolute on young stages, but discoidal and with closed umbilicus in the adult.

References
 Ebbighausen, V., Becker, R.T. & Bockwinkel, J. (2002): Morphometric Analyses and Taxonomy of oxyconic Goniatites (Paratornoceratinae n. subfam.)... Proceedings of the Geological Survey, 57, Vienna, 2002. 
The Paleobiology Database Paratornoceratinae entry
Paratornoceratinae in Goniat - Taxonomy

Dimeroceratidae
Devonian first appearances
Devonian extinctions